Ponga is the first live album by the instrumental band Ponga. It was released in 1999 on Loosegroove. The album is a recording of live improvisation with no over dubs at the O.K. Hotel and Litho in Seattle and Stuart's Coffee House in Bellingham, Washington.

Reception

The editorial staff of AllMusic Guide gave Ponga 4.5 out of five stars. Derrick A. Smith of All About Jazz also gave the recording a positive review, noting how it stood out from recordings of the period.

Track listing
"Pimba"
"Pick Up the Pieces of Saturn"
"Naugahide"
"Blowtorch"
"Awesome Wells"
"Ponga Amore"
"Liberace in Space"
"Bookin"

Personnel
Ponga
Wayne Horvitz – keyboards
Dave Palmer – keyboards
Bobby Previte – drums
Skerik – saxophone, samples

Technical personnel
Mel Dettmar – engineering

References

1999 debut albums
1999 live albums
Loosegroove Records live albums
Ponga (band) albums